The Raymond H. Fogler Library is an academic library at the University of Maine in Orono. The library's collections include approximately more than 1 million volumes, nearly 4 million periodical subscriptions, 1.6 million microforms, 2.2 million United States Federal, Maine State, and Canadian federal and provincial government publications.

History
The library's foundation was laid in 1941, but was not completed until 1947 due to World War II. The architects were William Harold Lee of Philadelphia and Crowell & Lancaster of Bangor. In 1962, it was renamed to honor Maine native, University of Maine alumnus and the final Assistant Secretary of the Navy, Raymond H. Fogler. In the following year, the library became a regional depository site for government documents. As of 2011, it is a depository for a number of collections, including the multi-generation political families of the Williamsons and the Hamlins. It is also home to the works of writer Stephen King, journalist Ralph W. 'Bud' Leavitt Jr. and politician William Cohen.

References

Buildings and structures at the University of Maine
Libraries in Penobscot County, Maine
Library buildings completed in 1947
1947 establishments in Maine
University and college buildings completed in 1947